The 1978 WDF Europe Cup was the 1st edition of the WDF Europe Cup darts tournament, organised by the World Darts Federation. It was held in Copenhagen, Denmark from 1 to 3 September.

Entered teams
13 countries/associations entered a team in the event

Men's singles

Men's Pairs

Men's team

References

Darts tournaments
1978 in darts